Stanley O. Gaines Jr. is a Social Psychologist and Senior Lecturer in the School of Social Sciences at Brunel University. Gaines is the lead author of Culture, Ethnicity, and Personal Relationship Processes, published by Routledge in 1997.

Personal and biographical information
Gaines earned a PhD in psychology from the University of Texas in 1991. Throughout this time he had the support of a UT-Austin graduate fellowship, a National Science Foundation graduate fellowship, and a Macalester College pre-doctoral fellowship. After graduate school he spent two years as a post-doctoral fellow and soon after served as an assistant professor of Psychology and Black Studies at Pomona College from 1993-2000. On June 30, 2000, Gaines’ contract expired and he was forced to leave Pomona College after being denied lifetime tenure. This followed with threat of Gaines going on a hunger strike and led him to “fight the College’s immoral, unethical, and illegal behavior toward me.” In 1996 he received a Ford Foundation fellowship to do more research at the University of North Carolina in Chapel Hill. In 2000, Gaines spent a year as a Fulbright Scholar at the University of the West Indies, and from 2001 to now, Gaines has been working as a senior lecturer at Brunel University. Gaines is also a chair member of the International Association for Relationship Research, an Editorial Advisory Board member for the Journal of Social and Personal Relationships, and a research fellow for the University of Bath.

Discussion of major area of work
As a trained social psychologist, Gaines specializes in close relationships and statistics. He has been able to publish in both mainstream and African-centered publications. His current research focuses on the links between objective poverty and individuals’ experience of inner wellbeing across time, among married men and women, and single women heading households in rural villages within India and Zambia. Gaines’ main areas of research include close relationships, culture and ethnicity, gender psychology, intergroup relations, interpersonal processes, personality and individual difference, prejudice and stereotyping, and research methods and assessment. Gaines is also the author Culture, Ethnicity, and Personal Relationship Processes published by Routledge in 1997.

Modelling Psychological Responses to the Great East Japan Earthquake and Nuclear Incident (2012)
In March 2011, an earthquake and then a major tsunami and a nuclear incident struck Eastern Japan. This study models the individual differences in the risk perceptions of these major events. It studies the implications of these perceptions on the relevant behaviors surrounding them. The study collected data 11–133 weeks after the events from 844 young respondents in three regions of Japan; Miyagi, Yokyo, and Western Japan. The study showed that there were shared normative concerns about the earthquake and nuclear risks along with conservation values, lack of trust in government aid and advice, and poor personal control of the nuclear incident. All of these were positively correlated with perceived earthquake and nuclear risks. Many of these perceptions predicted specific outcomes, such as leaving their homes or even Japan.

The study found that there were significant relationships between the respondent's individual values, their normative concerns of their friends and family, their sense of control over the threats, and their trust in the government's aid. All of these risk perceptions now predict a change in preventative measures that will be taken in the future. Avoidance behaviors are including many different safety measures (keeping first aid kits, modifying living quarters, wearing masks, and even contemplating leaving the country). There were, however, significant differences between regions in how they responded to the threat. There was great repeat earthquake anticipation in Tokyo, and behavioral changes were more prominent in areas affected by the March 2011 events. Trust in the government as far as their risk perception is concerned, was also lowered after the events.

Impact of Experiences with Racism on African-Descent Persons’ Susceptibility to Stereotype Threat Within the United Kingdom (2008)
This study on 103 people in the United Kingdom examined the impact of individual, institutional, cultural, and collective racism on a person's susceptibility to stereotype among African-descent persons. The study found that different experiences with these types of racism were not significant when relating to the susceptibility to stereotype threat. This was contrary to the study's original hypothesis. The only significant indicator came with experiences in collective racism and it showed that it was a positive predictor of susceptibility. This study dealt with implications for the continuing relevance of Erving Goffman's Symbolic Interactionist Theory and Construct of Stigma. It also related strongly to Claude Steele's construct of stereotype threat to the field of Black psychology.

While previous research on stereotype threat has mostly focused on academic aspects, this study decided to branch out and focus on stereotype threat on a wide range throughout the United Kingdom. Stereotype threat means the anxiety and potentially impaired performance that comes from the social stigma of inferiority an individual believes has already been evaluated in their domain. The study was considered relatively new, due to the fact that the majority of stereotype threat studies have been done in the United States. The hypothesis for the study was that the UK, like the US, would have high incidences of stereotype threat among African-descent people. In the study, 49 of the participants were men and 64 were women, and the average age of the participants was 28.12 years old. The entire study consisted of a snowball sampling for participants within the West London area. They were first given the consent document and then asked to complete the study survey about stereotype threat.

The most prominent finding from the study came from the significant positive effect of experience with collective racism on an African-descent persons’ susceptibility to stereotype threat. The effect was significant even after controlling for the other forms of racism. The study drew a connection in stereotype threat in modern times to a history where White mobs would gang up on Black individuals as a form of collective racism. The rest of the forms of racism were found to be insignificant, and this was noted as very surprising and unexpected. While the study was innovative for its area, it was also narrow and impractical. Their future research needs to have more lifelike scenarios instead of solely depending on an objective survey to find out about people's experiences. Individual definitions and sensitivities to racism can also be called into question. When comparing across a large spectrum of people, the study needs to make sure that all of the answers are relative and using a similar type of scale. The article also should have been more detailed about what the actual survey consisted of. However, the researchers did a good job staying unbiased. Although they inserted opinions into the article, they did not make conclusions or question the data because of it. Overall, the study was interesting and informative while researching an ever-changing topic.

Other references
 Plous, S. (2009, December 21). Stanley O. Gaines Jr. Retrieved November 17, 2012, from Social Psychology Network website: http://gaines.socialpsychology.org/research
 Gaines, Stanley O. Jr. (05/01/2012). "Impact of experiences with racism on African-descent persons’ susceptibility to stereotype threat within the United Kingdom.". Journal of black psychology (0095-7984), 38 (2), p. 135.
 Gaines, S. (2013, March 8). Stanley Gaines. Retrieved November 14, 2013, from Brunel University, London website: http://www.brunel.ac.uk/sss/psychology/staff-profiles/stanley-gaines
 Gaines, S. O. (2000, July 18). Pomona College Statement on Dr. Gaines' Hunger Strike. Retrieved November 16, 2013, from Tripod website:http://gmoses.tripod.com/gaines/sgdoc003.htm
 Gaines, S. O. Jr. (1997). Culture, ethnicity, and personal relationship processes. New York: Routledge.

References

Academics of Brunel University London
Living people
Year of birth missing (living people)
University of Texas alumni
Pomona College faculty